Tyagaraja is a crater on Mercury. Its name was adopted by the International Astronomical Union in 1976. Tyagaraja is named for the Indian composer Tyagaraja.

Tyagaraja is the third-largest crater of the Kuiperian system on Mercury, at 97 km diameter, after Bartók crater and Amaral crater.

Hollows are present within Tyagaraja.  Within the extensive hollows of Tyagaraja is a dark spot of low reflectance material (LRM), closely associated with the central peak complex.  Another prominent dark spot is located to the southwest of Tyagaraja, on the north rim of an unnamed crater.

The larger Phidias is to the north, and the crater Stevenson is to the east.

References

Impact craters on Mercury